Ghulam Muhammad Lali (born 4 March 1968) is a Pakistani politician who has been a member of the National Assembly of Pakistan, since August 2018. He is the tribal chief of the lali clan also. Previously he was a member of the National Assembly from June 2013 to May 2018.

Early life
He was born on 4 March 1968.Completed his studies from sargodha and lahore.

Political career
He was elected to the National Assembly of Pakistan as a candidate of Pakistan Muslim League (N) (PML-N) from Constituency NA-87 (Chiniot-II Cum-Jhang) in 2013 Pakistani general election. He received 94,234 votes and defeated Faisal Saleh Hayat. In October 2017, he was appointed as Federal Parliamentary Secretary for Defence Production.

In June 2018, he quit PML-N and joined Pakistan Tehreek-e-Insaf (PTI).

He was re-elected to the National Assembly as a candidate of PTI from Constituency NA-99 (Chiniot-I) in 2018 Pakistani general election.

References

Living people
1968 births
Pakistan Muslim League (N) MNAs
Pakistan Tehreek-e-Insaf MNAs
Pakistani MNAs 2013–2018
Pakistani MNAs 2018–2023